Cuba, an African Odyssey is a French 2007 documentary film directed by Jihan El-Tahri. The film was shown on Arte in two parts and released on  DVD on 3 October 2007.

Synopsis 
From the early 1960s to the early 1990s, Cuba was instrumental in supporting a number of leftist insurgencies and nationalist movements on the African continent, which it justified under the communist theory of proletarian internationalism. The documentary focuses on Cuba's role in the decolonization of Africa and the extent of its military intervention in several postcolonial African conflicts, such as the South African Border War, Angolan Civil War, and the Ogaden War.

Awards 
 Vues d'Afrique de Montréal 2007
 Sunny Side of the Docs, Marseille 2006
 FESPACO 2007

References

External links 

2007 films
French documentary films
2007 documentary films
Documentary films about the Cold War
Documentary films about the South African Border War
Documentary films about Cuba
2000s French films